Förbundet is the seventh studio album by the Swedish folk rock band Garmarna. Released in 2020, it is their first album on the Season of Mist label. Unlike the previous album 6 and similar to albums before that, Förbundet is again dominated by traditional instruments, melodies and lyrics, although there are still numerous electronic influences. These were added in cooperation with Christopher Juul of Heilung who also produced the album. Most tracks tell sinister folklore stories but the album includes two original titles written entirely by Garmarna. Anders Norudde of Hedningarna, Maria Franz of Heilung and Swedish folk singer Ulf Gruvberg appear as guest musicians.

Themes
The album focuses on dark folklore and on themes like departure, jealousy, old age, longing and tristesse. E.g. the first track and first single of the album references the fierce warrior Ramunder who, according to the band, "likes to smite his enemies out of pure joy."

Reception
Förbundet received mostly favourable professional reviews. Metal Hammer Portugal praised the work of lead singer Emma Härdelin and wrote that the album likened releases by Liz Fraser and the Cocteau Twins. According to their reviewer, "Förbundet comes at a time when we most need shamanic rhythms in a call to unite the tribes." The Sonic Seducer stated that the album constantly displayed a high artistic level in a musical mix that was unique to Garmarna. The Swedish Lira magazine called Förbundet the best Garmarna album since Guds spelemän (1996) and also mentioned Garmarna's "unique signature". Dagens Nyheter, however, wrote that Garmana had lost their orientation on an album that was "clinically devoid of warmth".

Track listing 
There are nine tracks on this album most of which are adaptations of traditional themes.

Personnel
Apart from the core members of Garmarna, Förbundet was recorded together with three guest musicians.

Music
Garmarna
 Emma Härdelin: vocals, violin
 Stefan Brisland-Ferner:  violin, viola, hurdy-gurdy, Nordic bowed harp, moraharpa, kantele, guitar, electronics, vocals
 Gotte Ringqvist: acoustic guitars, Hardanger fiddle, vocals
 Rickard Westman: guitar, bass
 Jens Höglin: drums, electronics

Guests
 Anders Norudde: moraharpa
 Maria Franz: vocals
 Ulf Gruvberg: vocals

Production
 Stefan Brisland-Ferner
 Christopher Juul

References

2020 albums
Garmarna albums
Swedish-language albums